was a Japanese football player. He played for Japan national team. His brother Nobuo Matsunaga and Seki Matsunaga also played for Japan national team.

National team career

Matsunaga was born in Yaizu on 21 September 1914. In 1936, when he was a Tokyo Liberal Arts and Science University student, he was selected Japan national team for 1936 Summer Olympics in Berlin. At this competition, on 4 August, he debuted and scored a goal against Sweden. Japan completed a come-from-behind victory against Sweden. The first victory in Olympics for the Japan and the historic victory over one of the powerhouses became later known as "Miracle of Berlin" (ベルリンの奇跡) in Japan. In 2016, this team was selected Japan Football Hall of Fame. On 7 August, he also played against Italy. He played 2 games and scored 1 goal for Japan in 1936.

Death
In 1937, Matsunaga entered the Imperial Japanese Army and served in World War II with the 230th Infantry Regiment as a lieutenant. On 20 January 1943, he was killed in action during the Guadalcanal Campaign at the age of 28.

National team statistics

References

External links
 
 
 Japan National Football Team Database
Japan Football Hall of Fame (Japan team at 1936 Olympics) at Japan Football Association
 Sports-Reference

1914 births
1943 deaths
University of Tsukuba alumni
Association football people from Shizuoka Prefecture
Japanese footballers
Japan international footballers
Olympic footballers of Japan
Footballers at the 1936 Summer Olympics
Japanese military personnel killed in World War II
Association football forwards
Imperial Japanese Army personnel of World War II
Imperial Japanese Army officers